Guassussê is the geographically largest district in the municipality of Orós, Ceará, Brazil. According to the IBGE, the estimated population in 2013 was 2,880 inhabitants. Known as "channel", a small river flows through the district.

History 

Guassussê's history is marked by the construction of the Orós Dam under President Juscelino Kubitschek. In 1960, when  the village of Conceição do Buraco was flooded by the waters of the newly inaugurated dam, the population needed to evacuate in the middle of the night to save their lives. Distraught, residents ended up on the other side of the hills running through the region, in the property of Manoel Raimundo Montanha. He gave part of his property to the homeless and they restarted their lives in that place that later was named Guassussê.

Economy 

The Guassussê district depends largely on agriculture, livestock and local businesses.

Education

Preschool 
E. E. F. Chapeuzinho Vermelho preschool operates there.

Elementary 
Elementary education is provided by two schools (1st to 4th grade - EEF Manoel Raimundo Mountain - and second - EEF Isaiah Cândido Rodrigues - from 5th to 8th grade).

High school 
The nearest high school is 18 km from the county seat, in Orós (Municipality Headquarters).

Religion 
The predominant religion is Catholicism, characterised by devotion to the district's patron saint, Our Lady of Conception. However, reflecting the phenomenon presented throughout Brazil, the number of evangelicals has increased considerably.

External links 
 

Populated places in Ceará